FANCL Corporation is a Japanese cosmetics and dietary supplements company incorporated on August 18, 1981.

History
FANCL was listed on the First Section of the Tokyo Stock Exchange in 1999.

On August 6, 2019, Kirin Holdings announced it would take a 33% stake in FANCL Corporation for US$1.21 billion.

References

External links

 Official website

Companies based in Yokohama
Companies listed on the Tokyo Stock Exchange
Chemical companies of Japan
Cosmetics companies of Japan
Japanese brands